The Normandy Format, also known as the Normandy contact group, is a grouping of states who met in an effort to resolve the War in Donbas and the wider Russo-Ukrainian War. The four countries who make up the group—Germany, Russia, Ukraine, and France—first met informally in 2014 during the 70th anniversary of D-Day celebrations in Normandy, France.

Creation and composition
The group was created on 6 June 2014, when leaders from France, Germany, Russia, and Ukraine met on the margins of the 70th anniversary of the D-Day allied landings in Normandy. It operates mainly through telephone calls between the leaders and their respective ministers of foreign affairs. The Normandy Format has at times been expanded to include Belarus, Italy, and the United Kingdom.

Meetings

2014 
Early talks in 2014 led to the establishment of the Trilateral Contact Group in order to facilitate further talks between Russia and Ukraine. This, along with mediation through the Normandy Format, directly led to the establishment of Minsk Protocol. This agreement, signed in September 2014, outlined several provisions for peace in the Donbas Region and Crimea.

2015 
Following a continued break-down of relations in early 2015, the Normandy Format met during talks in Belarus from 11 to 12 February 2015. This was precipitated by a joint French-Germany diplomatic plan, which was negotiated overnight for over sixteen hours while the group met in Minsk. The emerging package, Minsk II, negotiated ceasefires as well as planned domestic reforms in Ukraine.

Negotiations and talks were stalled from 2016 until autumn 2019.

2019
Ukrainian President Volodymyr Zelenskyy, in his May 2019 inaugural address made peace talks with Russia his top priority. He reaffirmed that priority in July that year when he invited via YouTube the other nations to a dialogue. He said: "Let's discuss who Crimea belongs to and who isn't in the Donbas region."

On 18 July 2019, a "comprehensive" cease-fire was agreed with arbitration by the Trilateral Contact Group on Ukraine.

In early September 2019, French President Emmanuel Macron and Russian President Vladimir Putin stated their intention to hold a Normandy format meeting. On 21 September, "continuing bickering" was cited as causing "a political tug-of-war" over the preliminaries to negotiations, as they had been since the Normandy Format meeting in 2016 in Berlin. Also in late September, a phone call between US President Donald Trump and Zelenskyy in which the latter described the support of France and Germany as lukewarm damaged Zelenskyy's image in Europe. On 10 October, Zelenskyy repeated his statement in a public news conference. On 16 October, French and German leaders decided in favour of another Normandy Format meeting.

2022
A Normandy Format meeting between the four countries' representatives was held in Paris on 26 January 2022 in the context of the lead-up to the 2022 invasion of Ukraine by Russia, to be followed by a telephone conversation between the French and Russian presidents on 28 January. The representatives of the four governments confirmed their support for Minsk II and committed themselves to resolving existing disagreements. They supported an unconditional ceasefire, and supported strengthening of the 22 July 2020 ceasefire, independent of their disagreements about implementing other components of Minsk II. A followup meeting was planned to take place in Berlin a fortnight later. No joint declaration was agreed upon at the conclusion of the nine-hour-long Normandy Format meeting held on 10 February, but the representatives planned to meet again in March. This meeting never occurred following the Russian invasion of Ukraine on 24 February 2022. Zelenskyy later announced that the Normandy Format was "destroyed" due to Russia's actions. France and Germany continue to be involved in peace-talks between the two countries, while also providing support to Ukraine while denouncing Russia.

Country leaders

2014–2017

2017–2019

2019–2021

2021–present

Meetings
The first six meetings were held from 2014 to 2019.
  Château de Bénouville, Bénouville, Normandy, France — 6 June 2014 — the first meeting in celebration of the 70th anniversary of Operation Overlord
  Milan, Italy — 16–17 October 2014 — as part of Asia–Europe Meeting
  Minsk, Belarus — 11–12 February 2015 — Minsk II was signed
  Paris, France — 2 October 2015
  Berlin, Germany — 19 October 2016
  Paris, France — 9 December 2019
  Paris, France — 26 January 2022
  Berlin, Germany — 10 February 2022

See also
 Budapest Memorandum on Security Assurances
 Minsk Protocol
 Trilateral Contact Group on Ukraine
 2021–2022 Russo-Ukrainian crisis

References

Russo-Ukrainian War
21st-century diplomatic conferences (Europe)
National security
2014 in politics
2015 in politics
2016 in politics
2014 in international relations
2015 in international relations
2016 in international relations
Foreign relations of Russia
Foreign relations of Ukraine
Foreign relations of France
Foreign relations of Germany
François Hollande
Angela Merkel
Emmanuel Macron
Vladimir Putin
Russia–Ukraine relations
Petro Poroshenko
Volodymyr Zelenskyy
2014 introductions